Alexeis Bell Quintero (born October 2, 1983), is a Cuban professional baseball outfielder.

Career
In 2008 in the Cuban National Series, Bell hit for 31 home runs and drove in 111 RBIs in only 90 games in the regular season. In addition, he totaled a league-record 252 bases and had the only 25-25 season in the history of Cuban baseball (stealing 25 bases and hitting more than 25 home runs). That year, Bell also led the Cuban league in runs (96) and slugging percentage (.722). In the playoffs, he hit 5 more home runs and, along with his teammate Rolando Meriño, led the offensive of Santiago de Cuba to a win in the Cuban League Championship in 2008. That season he became the first National Series player to hit 30 home runs and drive in 100 runs.

Since 2015, Bell has played professionally in North America. In 2015, he played for Quebec in the Can-Am League. He began 2016 with Quintana Roo in the Mexican League. On July 6, 2016, he signed a minor league contract with the Texas Rangers.

International career
He was selected the Cuba national baseball team at the 2008 Summer Olympics, 2012 exhibition games against Chinese Taipei and CPBL All-Stars, 2012 exhibition games against Japan, 2013 World Baseball Classic and 2014 Central American and Caribbean Games.

He was part of the Cuban team which won a silver medal at the 2008 Summer Olympics. In that tournament, he earned the batting crown, had the most extra-base hits and led in slugging percentage (.920).

He also won with the Cuban national team the gold medal at the 2014 Central American and Caribbean Games in Veracruz, Mexico.

References

External links 

1983 births
Living people
Arizona League Rangers players
Avispas de Santiago de Cuba players
Baseball outfielders
Baseball players at the 2008 Summer Olympics
Baseball players at the 2011 Pan American Games
Central American and Caribbean Games gold medalists for Cuba
Cocodrilos de Matanzas players
Competitors at the 2014 Central American and Caribbean Games
Frisco RoughRiders players
Québec Capitales players
Medalists at the 2008 Summer Olympics
Olympic baseball players of Cuba
Olympic medalists in baseball
Olympic silver medalists for Cuba
Pan American Games bronze medalists for Cuba
Pan American Games medalists in baseball
Sportspeople from Santiago de Cuba
Tigres de Quintana Roo players
2013 World Baseball Classic players
Central American and Caribbean Games medalists in baseball
Medalists at the 2011 Pan American Games